"Rough Boy" was the third single by American rock band ZZ Top from their 1985 album Afterburner. The song reached No. 5 on the Album Rock Tracks chart and No. 22 on the Billboard Hot 100, as well as No. 23 in the UK Singles Chart. Unlike the other songs on the album, this song has a much slower tempo and is more of a power ballad. It also shares a similar tune to their song "Leila" from their album El Loco.

Background
Hill said in 2007 "‘Rough Boy' is a pretty li'l song. We're doin' it this tour. We pulled it back out. I like that song so much, I had it played at my wedding.”

Reception
Cash Box called it a "rapturous teen ballad" in which "the band turns its leather-tough into pure silk."

Music video
The music video (directed by Steve Barron) features the band's "Eliminator" car/space shuttle hybrid (from the Afterburner album cover) visiting a space car wash, interspersed with images of the band members' hands and faces, as well as a woman's legs, protruding from metal plates, some of which double as lighted message signs or crosswalk signals.

Charts

Personnel
Billy Gibbons - guitar, lead vocals
Dusty Hill - bass, keyboard, backing vocals
Frank Beard - drums

References

ZZ Top songs
1980s ballads
1985 songs
1985 singles
Music videos directed by Steve Barron
Songs written by Billy Gibbons
Songs written by Dusty Hill
Songs written by Frank Beard (musician)
Rock ballads
Song recordings produced by Bill Ham